Don Petersen (August 8, 1927 – April 25, 1998) was an American playwright and screenwriter. Born in Davenport, Iowa, Petersen wrote the play Does a Tiger Wear a Necktie?, which debuted on Broadway on February 25, 1969, and ran for only 39 performances after 19 previews. Though a failure at the box office, the play was a succès d'estime, garnering Al Pacino a Tony Award and a Drama Desk Award. Petersen's second Broadway play, The Enemy is Dead, was a flop, opening and closing after one performance on January 14, 1973.

Petersen was credited with the screenplays for Deadly Hero (1975), An Almost Perfect Affair (1979) and Target (1985).

He died on April 25, 1998 at the age of 70 in Pittsfield, Massachusetts.

External links
 
 

1927 births
1998 deaths
20th-century American dramatists and playwrights
American male screenwriters
American male dramatists and playwrights
20th-century American male writers
20th-century American screenwriters